A cooperative is an association of persons who cooperate for their mutual benefit.

Cooperative or co-operative or variation, may also refer to:

 Cooperative, having cooperativeness

A type of cooperative
 Housing cooperative, e.g., a co-op apartment in a co-op apartment building
 Building cooperative
 Food cooperative

Entities named "Cooperative"
 The Co-operative (disambiguation), entities with the UK branding
 The Co-operative brand, used by several UK co-operative businesses
 The Co-operative Group, the largest co-operative in the UK
 Co-operatives UK
 Cooperatives of Norway
 Federated Co-operatives, a Canadian co-operative federation known for its branded products and stores
 Harvard/MIT Cooperative Society, a cooperative campus store based in Cambridge, Massachusetts, United States

Other uses
 Co-Operative, Kentucky, USA; an unincorporated community
 Cooperative School (disambiguation), multiple schools
 Co-operative University (disambiguation), multiple universities
 Cooperative High School, New Haven, Connecticut, USA
 The Cooperative, an informal association of turn-of-the-20th-century French academics

See also

 Cooperative game (disambiguation)
 Cooperative Bank (disambiguation), several banks
 Co-operative Party (disambiguation), several political party
 Co-operative Commonwealth (disambiguation)
 Co-operative Insurance Cup (disambiguation)
 Cooperative Hall of Fame, USA
 
 
 
 
 
 Operative (disambiguation)
 Coop (disambiguation)
 CO (disambiguation)